Patti Petersen Mirkovich is a retired American actress.

Petersen's brother costarred on ABC's The Donna Reed Show. She was written into the cast as Trisha, an adopted child after Shelley Fabares left the series. She stayed with the show until it ended in 1966.

After many commercials and industrial films, she semi-retired to marry and rear a family of her own. She was a country songwriter/singer for a while. Now known as Patti Petersen Mirkovich, she is the founder of an Internet company for novice authors, and is a teacher of computer studies for elementary, high school and adults. She has two children, Tim and Melissa.

Filmography
The Donna Reed Show (1963–66) (Trisha Stone) (99 episodes)
Television: The First Fifty Years (1999) (Trisha Stone, archive footage)
Real People with Stephanie Allensworth (2018) (Self) (Interview)

References

External links

Patti Petersen website

American child actresses
American television actresses
American educators
Actresses from Glendale, California
Living people
21st-century American women
Year of birth missing (living people)